The Bhagirathi Mali is a caste in North India, specially in western Uttar Pradesh, Haryana, Uttrakhand. They claim to be descendants of the Ikshvaku dynasty king Sagara and the Suryavansha king Bhagiratha, whom the community is named after King Harishchandra and Lord Rama were also born in this dynasty. Over time, there were many changes in the Mali society. With the passage of time, they made farming their way of living. Now they engage in business and farming, growing vegetables in their fields mainly. Due to growing vegetables in the fields, some of them are also called Mali, but which is different from reality. The case is not distinct from both the Mali and the Bhagirathi Mali castes actually.

See also
 Shakya

References

Social groups of Uttar Pradesh